Helcystogramma flavistictum is a moth in the family Gelechiidae. It was described by Hou-Hun Li and Hui Zhen in 2011. It is found in the Chinese provinces of Gansu, Henan and Shaanxi.

The wingspan is 13–14.5 mm. The forewings are yellowish brown, with scattered dark brown scales. The basal three-quarters of the costal margin and apex are dark brown, with yellow dots along the distal quarter of the costal margin and termen. The hindwings are grey.

Etymology
The species name refers to the yellow dots along the distal quarter of the costal margin and the termen on the forewing and is derived from Latin prefix flav- (meaning yellow) and Latin stictus (meaning spotted).

References

Moths described in 2011
flavistictum
Moths of Asia